Larry L. Greenfield is a Baptist writer, educator, theologian, minister, non-profit executive and Interfaith activist. He is the former executive director of the Parliament of the World's Religions and was the executive minister of American Baptist Churches USA. Greenfield is a former dean of students at the University of Chicago and also served as the president of the Colgate Rochester Crozer Divinity School.

Awards 

Greenfield was awarded the University of Chicago Divinity School Alumni of the Year award in 1990.  He received his Ph.D. from the school.

References 

Date of birth missing (living people)
Living people
American male writers
American theologians
University of Chicago Divinity School alumni
Year of birth missing (living people)